The 1956 Chicago Cubs season was the 85th season of the Chicago Cubs franchise, the 81st in the National League and the 41st at Wrigley Field. The Cubs finished eighth and last in the National League with a record of 60–94.

Offseason 
 November 27, 1955: 1955 rule 5 draft
Billy Muffett was drafted from the Cubs by the St. Louis Cardinals.
Vito Valentinetti was drafted by the Cubs from the Toronto Maple Leafs.
 November 28, 1955: Hal Jeffcoat was traded by the Cubs to the Cincinnati Redlegs for Hobie Landrith.
 December 9, 1955: Frank Baumholtz was purchased from the Cubs by the Philadelphia Phillies.
 December 9, 1955: Randy Jackson and Don Elston were traded by the Cubs to the Brooklyn Dodgers for Don Hoak, Russ Meyer, and Walt Moryn.
 March 30, 1956: Hank Sauer was traded by the Cubs to the St. Louis Cardinals for Pete Whisenant.

Regular season

Season standings

Record vs. opponents

Roster

Player stats

Batting

Starters by position 
Note: Pos = Position; G = Games played; AB = At bats; H = Hits; Avg. = Batting average; HR = Home runs; RBI = Runs batted in

Other batters 
Note: G = Games played; AB = At bats; H = Hits; Avg. = Batting average; HR = Home runs; RBI = Runs batted in

Pitching

Starting pitchers 
Note: G = Games pitched; IP = Innings pitched; W = Wins; L = Losses; ERA = Earned run average; SO = Strikeouts

Other pitchers 
Note: G = Games pitched; IP = Innings pitched; W = Wins; L = Losses; ERA = Earned run average; SO = Strikeouts

Relief pitchers 
Note: G = Games pitched; W = Wins; L = Losses; SV = Saves; ERA = Earned run average; SO = Strikeouts

Farm system 

LEAGUE CHAMPIONS: Los Angeles, Paris; LEAGUE CO-CHAMPIONS: Lafayette

Notes

References 

1956 Chicago Cubs season at Baseball Reference

Chicago Cubs seasons
Chicago Cubs season
Chicago Cubs